Haley Elizabeth Reinhart (born September 9, 1990) is an American singer, songwriter and actress from Wheeling, Illinois. She first rose to prominence after placing third in the 10th season of American Idol. In July 2011, Reinhart signed a recording deal with Interscope Records. Her debut album Listen Up! was released on May 22, 2012, to critical acclaim, and she subsequently became the first American Idol alumna to perform at Lollapalooza.

Reinhart garnered widespread recognition in 2015 for performing and touring with Scott Bradlee's Postmodern Jukebox. Her most notable collaboration with the band on a jazz cover of Radiohead's "Creep" spent 58 consecutive weeks on Billboard's Jazz Digital Songs chart and received critical acclaim. In the same year, she gained additional notice when her cover of Elvis Presley's "Can't Help Falling in Love", which was used in a commercial for Extra Gum, became a viral sensation, peaked at number 16 on the US Adult Contemporary chart, and was later certified Gold by the Recording Industry Association of America on February 17, 2017. Reinhart won a Cannes Lion for Entertainment and a Clio Award for the song in 2016. Additionally, she made her voice acting debut as Bill Murphy in the Netflix animated comedy F Is for Family on December 18, 2015. She reprised the role as a main cast member in the series' second, third, fourth, and fifth seasons.

Her second studio album, Better, served as an expansion of an initially conceived EP and was released on April 29, 2016, following the lead single and title track, "Better", which was released on April 8. The album debuted at number 22 on Billboards Independent Albums chart. She supported the release of the album with a 2016 summer headlining tour that was held throughout the United States and a spring leg that was held throughout Europe in May and June 2017. Reinhart's third studio album, What's That Sound?, was released September 22, 2017 through Concord Records. The album produced four singles in total, including the lead single, "Baby It's You", which was released June 16, 2017. Reinhart supported the album with a 2017 fall US headlining solo tour.

In 2018, Reinhart gained additional notice as a featured vocalist on Jeff Goldblum's debut album The Capitol Studios Sessions and on Vicetone's single "Something Strange", which peaked at number 23 on Billboards Dance/Mix Show Airplay charts. On June 1, 2018, she released the standalone single "Last Kiss Goodbye", which charted at number 15 on Billboards Jazz Digital Songs chart. Reinhart's fourth studio album, Lo-Fi Soul, was released on March 27, 2019. The album produced four singles in total, including the lead single "Don't Know How to Love You", which was released on September 14, 2018. The album was supported with a headlining North American tour in the fall of 2019.

Reinhart made her live-action acting debut in Robert Rodriguez's science fiction superhero film, We Can Be Heroes, released in 2020 via Netflix. On September 4, 2022, Reinhart released her new EP "Off The Ground". In support of the release, Reinhart headlined theaters throughout the Midwest. In Winter 2023, Reinhart will continue her "Off The Ground Tour" throughout North America.

Early life
Haley Elizabeth Reinhart was born in Wheeling, Illinois, on September 9, 1990, to Patti Miller-Reinhart and Harry Reinhart, both of whom are musicians and native Chicagoans from the north side and south side, respectively. She has one sister, Angela, who is five years younger than she. Angela is a singer-songwriter and musician, as well, and she primarily performs indie folk music. Reinhart is of German, Irish, and Italian descent. Around the age of three, her parents would hold her up on stage and have her sing the chorus or vocal harmonies for "Brown Eyed Girl". She began singing seriously when she was 7 or 8 years old, performing with her parents' band, Midnight, which covers rock songs from the 1960s and 1970s. Reinhart's mother was also the lead singer for a band called The Company She Keeps before she joined Midnight in 1977. When she was nine years old, Reinhart sang LeAnn Rimes' 1996 arrangement of Bill Mack's 1958 classic, "Blue", on a big stage at a tattoo convention, and she was met with "overwhelming" support from the audience. She has been writing poetry since she was eight years old and has competed in many poetry slam competitions throughout her life. She also has a passion for improv and has been active in plays, musicals, and skit performances since childhood. Reinhart began writing songs in Middle School, and she explains that "when I give myself the time to sit down, and reflect, and feel, and let things come out, I find that it's very easy for me to do." She had several hundred compositions saved on her cell phone before it broke, losing all of the material. Reinhart had planned on auditioning for American Idol ever since middle school, where she received an award at the end of the year for student "Most Likely to Be on American Idol".

She attended Mark Twain Elementary School, O.W. Holmes Middle School, and Wheeling High School. While in high school, Reinhart was first introduced to Jazz music after becoming a part of the school's vocal group called Midnight Blues. She eventually performed at the 2009 Montreux Jazz Festival and Umbria Jazz Festival with her high school's jazz band, of which she was the first ever permanent singer. She reunited with the jazz band in 2015 when the director invited her to sing in their show at The Midwest Clinic located at McCormick Place – West, south of downtown Chicago. After graduating from high school in 2009, Reinhart attended Harper College in Palatine, Illinois from 2009 to 2010, where she studied jazz as a full-time student. She performed with the college's Jazz Ensemble and Jazz Lab. These events during her late education allowed her to gain experience singing Cole Porter standards in such historic places as Switzerland and Italy. Reinhart also fronted a band during college under such tentative names as Haley's Comet and Reinhart & the Rastatutes; the band covered classic rock songs from Led Zeppelin and other famous artists of the time. She worked as a lifeguard at the Family Aquatic Center, a waterpark at the Wheeling Park District, for four years prior to auditioning for American Idol.

Idol career

2009–2011: American Idol overview 

Reinhart first auditioned for the ninth season of American Idol, in Chicago, but did not advance to the Hollywood round. However, she returned the following year for the tenth season of Idol in Milwaukee, Wisconsin, and advanced after singing The Beatles' "Oh! Darling". Although she auditioned with two songs, the first being Alicia Keys's "Fallin'", only her second song choice of "Oh! Darling" was aired on television.

She successfully progressed through the first Hollywood solo round after singing "Breathless" by Corinne Bailey Rae. In the group round of Hollywood week, her group mates included fellow finalist Paul McDonald, and she advanced even after forgetting some of the lyrics to "Carry On Wayward Son". Later in the second solo round, she performed "God Bless the Child", impressing the judges and making a comeback from her weaker group performance. In the Vegas Round, she grouped up with fellow finalists Naima Adedapo and Jacob Lusk to perform The Beatles's "The Long and Winding Road", which earned all three contestants a spot among the final 48 competitors. Reinhart was selected by the judges as a semi-finalist after her final Hollywood solo performance, and she was later voted into the Top 12 finalists after singing "Fallin'" by Alicia Keys during the live semi-final show. Though she was among the bottom three singers on four occasions during the finals, she advanced through to the penultimate week of the competition after giving memorable performances of "House of the Rising Sun" and "I (Who Have Nothing)" during Top 5-week and Top 4-week, respectively. She was eliminated in third place behind Scotty McCreery and Lauren Alaina, who progressed to the finale. She sang "Bennie and the Jets" for her farewell encore performance. Though the judges often harshly criticized her for song choices and stage presence, she was considered a fan-favorite and a dark horse in the competition.

She is the only season 10 contestant who has over one million views on six of her YouTube performance videos: her renditions of Adele's "Rolling in the Deep", Elton John's "Bennie and the Jets", Ben E. King's "I (Who Have Nothing)", and her version of "House of the Rising Sun". Her performance of "God Bless the Child" hit 1,000,000 views in March 2014. The video of her audition performance of "Oh! Darling" reached 1,000,000 views in March 2016. Reinhart was also the only contestant in season 10 who received three standing ovations from the judges in consecutive weeks: "The House of the Rising Sun", "I (Who Have Nothing)", and Led Zeppelin's "What Is and What Should Never Be". Her performance of "Moanin'" with fellow contestant Casey Abrams during the Top 8 results show also received a standing ovation from the judges and was considered one of the best duets and performances of the season. The following year, Reinhart performed her cover of "Bennie and the Jets" at Muhammad Ali's Celebrity Fight Night XIX, an event benefiting the Muhammad Ali Parkinson's Center at Barrow Neurological Institute in Phoenix.

In 2015, Reinhart joined her father for a concert at the Chicago Auto Show First Look Charity Event, held in February. Additionally, in mid-December she performed for the children at UC Davis Children's Hospital in Sacramento, California, with the help of Casey Abrams, before joining radio DJ Kory for Mix 96's "Mix Cares For Kids" Radiothon, which was held inside of the hospital. As part of her 2016 radio promotion tour for "Can't Help Falling in Love", Reinhart performed with The Band Perry at Revolution Hall on February 20, 2016, for The Buzz's concert in support of the Children's Cancer Association. She also performed for a special Mix Lounge live event at the Boston Flower & Garden Show Preview Party on March 15, 2016. All proceeds were donated to the Genesis Foundation for Children. Also in March, Reinhart performed at Dell Children's Medical Center during SXSW as part of the "West of the Fest" venue. The show was sponsored by the Children's Cancer Association and aimed to "infuse the hospital environment with the healing power of music."

On April 30, 2016, Reinhart held a Better benefit concert at Durty Nellie's Pub in Palatine, Illinois for the development of multimedia sexual abuse prevention curriculum for the PAVE and Erin's Law organizations. Her concert was held in conjunction with The Empowerment Summit, which provided professional presentations on topics including sexual abuse and mental health. Of the show, Reinhart stated:
"the new album is going to be released the day before, so it's going to be a big homecoming on lots of levels. I'm also going to have my parents' band backing me up for that show, which is going to be great. And the cause itself is something I've really wanted to put energy and time into since I was a young girl. Plus, April happens to be Sexual Assault awareness month. I'm just happy to be a part of it."

On January 28, 2017, Reinhart served as a celebrity guest judge alongside Casey Abrams, Clark Beckham, and Anthony Federov for an American Idol-style benefit concert titled Rally Idol, which featured performances by six children affected by childhood cancer. Produced by television production technology students at the Chattahoochee Technical College, all proceeds from the event went to the Rally Foundation, which works to find cures and treatments for childhood cancers. On October 7, 2017, Reinhart performed at the 4th Annual Pongo Environmental Awards in West Pasadena, California. The event honored environmental achievement in film, science, conservation, and technology, and celebrated Orang Utan Republik Foundation's (OURF) tenth anniversary as well as their mission to save critically endangered Orangutans and their habitat.

On September 29, 2018, Reinhart sang at PAVE's benefit concert at the Patio Theater in Portage Park, Chicago. A limited meet and greet was offered for attendees who participated in a fundraising contest, with funds once again benefiting sexual assault awareness and prevention education. Some proceeds from the concert also benefited Seleh Freedom, an organization that fights human trafficking. On January 16, 2020, Reinhart performed at the Hotel Café as part of a fundraising event in support of the Bushfires in Australia. On January 23, Reinhart performed with Robby Krieger and John Densmore at the Homeward Bound charity concert, with benefits supporting efforts to fight homelessness throughout California.

Discography 

 Listen Up! (2012)
 Better (2016)
 What's That Sound? (2017)
 Lo-Fi Soul (2019)
 Off the Ground (2022)

Concert tours

Headlining
 Better Tour (2016–17)
 What's That Sound? Tour (2017)
 Lo-Fi Soul Tour (2019 - Spring & Fall)
 Off The Ground  (2022)

Supporting
 American Idols LIVE! Tour 2011 (2011)
 Postmodern Jukebox World Tour (2015)
 Postmodern Jukebox European Tour (London) (2016)
 Postmodern Jukebox European Tour (Monaco, Italy, Germany, France) (2017)

Filmography 

 American Idol (2011, 2012, 2016, 2022)
 Hell's Kitchen (2012)
 90210 (2012)
 Real Music Live (2013)
 F Is for Family (2015–2021)
 We Can Be Heroes (2020)
 Americana (short film) (2022)

References

External links 

Haley Reinhart on Allmusic

1990 births
Living people
American blues singer-songwriters
American Idol participants
American neo soul singers
American people of German descent
American people of Irish descent
American people of Italian descent
American rock songwriters
American voice actresses
American women jazz singers
American jazz singers
American women pop singers
American women rock singers
American women singer-songwriters
Blues musicians from Illinois
Concord Records artists
Interscope Records artists
Jazz musicians from Illinois
People from Wheeling, Illinois
Singer-songwriters from Illinois
19 Recordings artists
21st-century American singers
21st-century American women singers